Alexander Lindsay (born 18 December 1936) is a British rower. He competed in the men's eight event at the 1960 Summer Olympics.

References

External links
 
 

1936 births
Living people
British male rowers
Olympic rowers of Great Britain
Rowers at the 1960 Summer Olympics
Rowers from Greater London